This is a list of awards and nominations received by Taiwanese actress Shu Qi.

Film

Asian Film Awards

Changchun Film Festival

China Film Director's Guild Awards

Chinese Film Media Awards

Golden Horse Awards

Golden Bauhinia Awards

Fantastic Fest

Hong Kong Film Award

Huabiao Awards

Hundred Flowers Awards

Macau International Movie Festival

Shanghai Film Critics Awards

References

Shu Qi